Joseph Oluwagbemiga Mayowa Hungbo (born 15 January 2000) is an English professional footballer who plays as a winger for EFL Championship club Huddersfield Town, on loan from Watford.

Club career

Early career 
As a child, Hungbo played for local side Hillyfielders FC. He was spotted by Crystal Palace in 2009 when he joined his brother Jacob at session run by a club coach at Peckham Rye Park. Following a trial, he signed for the club's under-9s. He was named the club's u9-u16 player of the year for 2015–16 and started a two-year scholarship in summer 2016, later captaining the club's under-18 side.

Call up to Crystal Palace first team 
In summer 2018, Hungbo became a professional, signing a one-year contract with the club. He was loaned to Isthmian Premier Division side Margate in January 2019 for the rest of the 2018–19 season. Playing under Mike Sandmann, his former under-9s coach at Palace, he made nine appearances.

Watford 
In summer 2019 Hungbo was released by Crystal Palace and subsequently signed for fellow Premier League side Watford. On 4 December 2019, after an impressive run of form for Watford's under-23's, Hungbo travelled with the first team squad for an away Premier League game against Leicester City. On 23 January 2020, Hungbo made his senior debut for Watford, starting in a 2–1 FA Cup third round replay defeat away at Tranmere Rovers. 

Hungbo joined National League side Aldershot Town on a short-term loan deal on 12 November 2020. After featuring in six league games for the Shots, Hungbo returned to Watford on 8 January 2021.

Loan to Ross County
On 17 August 2021, Hungbo joined Scottish Premiership club Ross County on a season-long loan. On 22 August 2021, he made his debut as a substitute for David Cancola in a 2-4 home league loss against Rangers. In Ross County's first victory of the season, he scored a stunning free kick - a goal that would end up winning him the SPFL Goal of the Month.

Loan to Huddersfield Town
On 16 January 2023, Hungbo joined fellow EFL Championship side Huddersfield Town on loan for the remainder of the 2022–23 season.

Personal life
Hungbo is the fifth of six children born to Samuel, a Nigerian, and Rachel, a Togolese. His parents and three oldest brothers emigrated to London from Nigeria in the mid-1990s. Hungbo, an older brother, Jacob, and younger sister, Elizabeth, were all born in the United Kingdom. He was raised in Camberwell, and attended Sacred Heart Catholic School in Camberwell for secondary school before moving to the Crystal Palace affiliated Oasis Academy Shirley Park.

Career statistics

Club

References

2000 births
Living people
Footballers from Lambeth
English footballers
Association football wingers
Crystal Palace F.C. players
Margate F.C. players
Watford F.C. players
Aldershot Town F.C. players
Huddersfield Town A.F.C. players
Isthmian League players
Black British sportspeople
English sportspeople of Nigerian descent
English people of Togolese descent
Ross County F.C. players
Scottish Professional Football League players